David Latta (born January 3, 1967 in Thunder Bay, Ontario) is a former professional ice hockey left winger.  He was drafted in the first round, 15th overall, by the Quebec Nordiques in the 1985 NHL Entry Draft.  He played thirty-six games in the National Hockey League, all with the Nordiques.

Career statistics

Regular season and playoffs

International

External links

1967 births
Adler Mannheim players
Anchorage Aces players
Augsburger Panther players
Canadian ice hockey left wingers
Cincinnati Cyclones (IHL) players
EC Bad Tölz players
EC Peiting players
Fredericton Express players
Halifax Citadels players
Ice hockey people from Ontario
Kitchener Rangers players
Living people
Manchester Storm (1995–2002) players
National Hockey League first-round draft picks
New Haven Nighthawks players
Quebec Nordiques draft picks
Quebec Nordiques players
Sportspeople from Thunder Bay
Canadian expatriate ice hockey players in Germany